Przytok may refer to the following places:
Przytok, Lubusz Voivodeship (west Poland)
Przytok, Pomeranian Voivodeship (north Poland)
Przytok, West Pomeranian Voivodeship (north-west Poland)